The La Confortable was a French cyclecar produced around 1920.  The car was quite small, with a single-cylinder two-stroke engine of 344 cc, built by Train.

References
 David Burgess Wise, The New Illustrated Encyclopedia of Automobiles.

Cyclecars
Confortable, La